Cheirodonta is a genus of gastropods belonging to the family Triphoridae.

The genus has almost cosmopolitan distribution.

Species:

Cheirodonta dupliniana 
Cheirodonta labiata 
Cheirodonta pallescens

References

Triphoridae